Joule is a Korean fusion restaurant in Seattle, in the U.S. state of Washington.

Located in the Wallingford neighborhood, the steakhouse is owned by married chefs Rachel Yang and Seif Chirchi. Joule opened in 2007. The kalbi has a marinade with sake, mirin, pureed Asian pear, garlic, and soy sauce, and is served with gochuchang and kimchi. The menu has also included hanger steak with fermented soybean, a flat iron steak with pepper, tteok (Korean rice cakes), pickled mustard greens, and chorizo. The restaurant makes and smokes tofu, sometimes adding a confit of hon-shimeji mushrooms, thyme, and soy-truffle vinaigrette. A dessert called the "Joule box" has tapioca in coconut milk with grapefruit panna cotta and coconut.

See also 

 List of Korean restaurants
 List of steakhouses

References

External links
 Joule at Relay Restaurant Group

Asian restaurants in Seattle
Korean restaurants in the United States
Steakhouses in Washington (state)
Wallingford, Seattle
Korean fusion cuisine